Brasiliorchis schunkeana (syn. Maxillaria schunkeana) is a species of orchid. The colors of its flower are very close to black, but it is actually a very dark purple-red, giving the impression of a black flower.

Distribution
The plant is found in the rainforest in Espírito Santo State, Brazil, at elevations of 600 to 700 meters.
Primarily found in forest biomes, this genus is easily diagnosed by its sulcate to ridged, bifoliate pseudobulbs and its long-lasting campanulate.

References

Bibliography 
 

schunkeana
Endemic orchids of Brazil
Orchids of Espírito Santo
Plants described in 1993